Jane Frances Connors (born 1953) is an Australian academic and lawyer who served as Director of International Advocacy at Amnesty International. She is a Visiting Professor in Practice at the London School of Economics and Political Science’s Centre for Women, Peace and Security and has taught in several other universities including University of Canberra and the Australian National University in Australia.

Background and career 
Connors was born in Sydney, New South Wales, Australia and was the first of eight children. Her father, John was a surgeon and her mother, Patricia was a nurse. She was educated at St Benedict's Primary School, Narrabundah, Canberra and at St Clare's College, Griffith before studying Law and Arts at the Australian National University in Canberra. After graduation, she taught Law at the Canberra College of Advanced Education (renamed University of Canberra) before moving to England, United Kingdom where she taught at the Universities of Nottingham in 1982 and Lancaster in 1983, and later transferred to University of London's School of Oriental and African Studies.

References 

Living people
1953 births
Academic staff of the University of Canberra
Australian women lawyers
Amnesty International people
Lawyers from Sydney
Australian National University alumni
Academic staff of the Australian National University